Florin Oprea (born 2 January 1948) is a Romanian former footballer who played as a goalkeeper. He was part of "U" Craiova's team that won the 1973–74 Divizia A, which was the first trophy in the club's history.

Honours
Universitatea Craiova
Divizia A: 1973–74
Cupa României runner-up: 1974–75

References

External links
Florin Oprea at Labtof.ro

1948 births
Living people
Romanian footballers
Association football goalkeepers
Liga I players
Liga II players
CS Universitatea Craiova players
People from Dolj County